Tim Kelleher is an American writer, actor and director.

Biography

Early life
Born in the Bronx, Kelleher grew up across the five boroughs of New York City, including Staten Island. After college he entered the Maryland Province of the Society of Jesus (Jesuit). After the novitiate, he chose to return to New York and train as a stage actor, studying under Robert Patterson.

Career
With friends, Kelleher founded the Colony Theatre and served as its Artistic Director, staging the work of new playwrights as well as classics. His acting career has included guest appearances on numerous TV shows, and a turn as the resident villain on NBC's Sci-Fi series, Dark Skies. Kelleher‘s more than two dozen film credits include Malcolm X, Operation Dumbo Drop, Independence Day, The Negotiator, Thirteen Days, Flash of Genius, Seven Pounds and Inception.
 
Kelleher directed the short-form film The Skell, and in 2008, he wrote and directed Wake-Up Call, a pilot that did not go to series.

Personal life
Kelleher is married to Canadian novelist Billie Livingston. Religion has remained an interest of his and in 1995 he was received into the Ukrainian Greek Catholic Church.Putinism and the Ukrainian Catholic Church, article, First Things In keeping with his faith, in 2011 he wrote and produced, The Creed: What Christians Profess, and Why it Ought to Matter, a documentary film for First Things magazine featuring scholars and thinkers. He also serves as New Media Editor for First Things, where he writes on topics related to religion, politics and culture.  In 2019 he was ordained a deacon in the Ukrainian Orthodox Church.

Filmography
{| class="wikitable" style="font-size: 90%;"
! colspan="4" style="background: LightSteelBlue;" | Film
|-
! Year
! Title
! Role
! Notes
|-
|1988|| The Understudy: Graveyard Shift II || Duke / Larry ||
|-
|1989|| Blue Vengeance || Detective ||
|-
|1989|| Black Rain || Bobby ||
|-
|1991|| Late for Dinner || Man at Catering Truck ||
|-
|1992|| Malcolm X || Cop at Harlem Station #3 ||
|-
|1993|| Teenage Mutant Ninja Turtles III || Raphael || Voice
|-
|1994|| Terminal Velocity || Jump Junkie #1 ||
|-
|1995|| Operation Dumbo Drop || C-123 Pilot ||
|-
|1995|| Clockers || Narc #2 ||
|-
|1995|| Never Talk to Strangers || Wabash ||
|-
|1996|| The Birdcage || Waiter in Club ||
|-
|1996|| Executive Decision || Bulldog ||
|-
|1996|| Independence Day || Technician ||
|-
|1998|| Desperate Measures || Helicopter Shooter ||
|-
|1998|| The Negotiator || Argento ||
|-
|1999|| Made Men || Deputy Conley ||
|-
|2000|| Thirteen Days || Ted Sorensen ||
|-
|2003|| Matchstick Men || Bishop ||
|-
|2008|| Flash of Genius' || Charlie Defao ||
|-
|2008|| Seven Pounds || Stewart Goodman ||
|-
|2010|| Inception || Thin Man ||
|}

References

External links

 The Tim Kelleher Homepage
First Things Magazine
Bear Trap, article, First Things

American male film actors
American male stage actors
American male television actors
Members of the Ukrainian Greek Catholic Church
Converts to Eastern Catholicism from Roman Catholicism
Living people
Year of birth missing (living people)
Male actors from New York City
People from the Bronx